Southern Tier Brewing Company is a craft brewing company in Lakewood, NY, in the southwestern section of NY state known as the Southern Tier.

History
The company was founded in 2001 by Phineas DeMink and Allen "Skip" Yahn. They purchased old equipment from the Old Saddleback Brewing Co. in Pittsfield, Massachusetts. By 2003, the brewery had expanded to multiple varieties of small batch ales distributed locally. By 2005, the company had expanded its distribution to cover the majority of New York State and Pennsylvania. In 2009, a new 20,000-sq-ft building was built to accommodate the company's expansion nationally and internationally.

In 2010, 800 barrels of fermentation vessels were built, as well as a 7,500 square-foot addition to the conditioning room. The brew house expanded from 20 BBL to a 50 BBL system. The company also added a new bottling line that fills, caps and labels over 10,000 bottles per hour at full speed. They also added a cellar to add another 7,200 BBL of fermentation space.

In 2012, a new brewhouse installation began of a 110-barrel Steinecker brewhouse imported from Germany. A new tasting room was installed as the ending point of Saturday afternoon tours with 14 draught lines. In 2013, a 45,000 sq. ft. warehouse, wastewater treatment facility, and distribution center were built.

On February 16, 2016, Southern Tier allied with Victory Brewing Company to become part of the Artisanal Brewing Ventures holding company.

In January 2017, Southern Tier opened its first satellite brewpub in Pittsburgh, Pennsylvania with thirty different beers on tap.

In September 2018, its second satellite location opened in Cleveland, Ohio with 30+ draft offerings. 

In March 2021, Southern Tier acquired the restaurant 716 Food and Sport at LECOM Harborcenter in Buffalo from Pegula Sports and Entertainment.

Brews

Year-round standard
 IPA – triple hopped intrepid ale
 2x IPA – double IPA
 Live – a citrusy session pale ale
 Tangier – a session pale ale brewed with tangerine peels
 Right-O-Way IPA – a session India pale ale
 One Buffalo – brewed with Willamette hops and centennial hops and 2-row malt, oats, and wheat. Developed under the tutelage of Terry and Kim Pegula for their sports and entertainment properties.
 Porter – brewed with 2 varieties of hops & 5 types of malts
 Phin & Matts – brewed with 3 varieties of hops & 3 types of malts
 2x Stout – a milk stout
 Pilsner – traditional Pilsner malt bill complemented by German Lager yeast and German noble hops

Year-round imperials
 Cherry Gose – an imperial sour ale with NY tart cherries
 Unearthly IPA – a "vigorously" hopped beer
 Gemini – A hopped beer smoothed out with malts

Seasonal imperials
 Krampus – a Helles lager with extra malt. Seasonal November release
 Pumking – Classic pumpkin ale with 8.6 ABV. Seasonal release starting in mid-July
 Back Burner – An old English style barley wine
 3 Citrus Peel Out – wheat ale brewed with orange, grapefruit, and tangerine peels
 Warlock - Imperial Pumpkin Stout. 8.6 ABV. Pumpkin pie laced with coffee and dark chocolate.

Other seasonal brews
 Harvest – Autumn ale
 Old Man – Winter ale

References

See also
 Beer in the United States

Beer brewing companies based in New York (state)
Chautauqua County, New York
Companies established in 2002
Companies based in New York (state)